The Palace of Justice of the Argentine Nation (more often referred locally as Palacio de Justicia or Palacio de Tribunales), is a large building complex located in Buenos Aires, Argentina. It is the seat of the Supreme Court and other lower courts. 

The Palace in film
Many movies were filmed inside the palace.

 1997 Ashes of Paradise
 2009 The Secret in Their Eyes
 2015 El Clan 
 2020 The Crimes That Bind
 2022 Argentina, 1985

See also
 Casa Rosada
 Palace of the Argentine National Congress
 List of National Historic Monuments of Argentina

External links
 
 Visita Guiada at Corte Suprema de Justicia de la Nación 

Courthouses
Palaces in Buenos Aires
Government buildings in Argentina
Government buildings completed in 1942
Buildings and structures in Buenos Aires
National Historic Monuments of Argentina
Neoclassical architecture in Argentina
1942 establishments in Argentina